Pinky, Elmyra & the Brain is an American animated television series featuring characters from the television series Tiny Toon Adventures and Pinky and the Brain, both created by Tom Ruegger. The series was executive produced by Steven Spielberg and produced by Warner Bros. Animation and Amblin Television. It aired from 1998 to 1999 on Kids' WB, running for 13 episodes. This show would be Spielberg's final collaborative effort with Warner Bros. Animation until the 2020 revival of Animaniacs.

Premise 
The series starts with ACME Labs destroyed (it would then be converted into a Dissy Store), leaving Pinky (Rob Paulsen) and the Brain (Maurice LaMarche) homeless and on the run from a man named Wally Faust. Pinky and the Brain finally end up in a pet shop in Shanghai and take refuge inside a turtle; they are still inside the turtle when it is purchased by Elmyra Duff (Cree Summer) and named Mr. Shellbutt. In their new home, Pinky and the Brain continue to attempt new methods of trying to take over the world while at the same time enduring, and later accepting and adjusting to, Elmyra's affection.

New characters 
 Wally Faust (voiced by Jeff Bennett)
 Rudy Mookich (voiced by Nancy Cartwright)
 Vanity White (voiced by Jane Wiedlin)
 Andrew Loam (voiced by Pamela Segall)
 Ms. Entebbe (voiced by Andrea Martin)
 Principal Cheevers (voiced by John Vernon)
 Shad Equipo (voiced by David Paymer)
 Mr. Pussy Wussy (voiced by Frank Welker)
 Dr. Glen Tarantella (voiced by Fred Willard)
 Lloyd Oldtire (voiced by Ed Begley, Jr.)
 Rockin' John (voiced by Ben Stein)
 Claude Gristle (voiced by Townsend Coleman)
 Nurse Gland (voiced by T'Keyah Crystal Keymáh)
 Ziff Twyman (voiced by Jack Carter)
 Taylor Tyler, Hoovie and Billy (voiced by Jason Marsden)
 Clarence (voiced by Julianne Beuscher)
 Chorus members (voiced by Steve Bernstein and Bob Joyce)

Development 
Warner Bros. network executives had reportedly wanted Pinky and the Brain to be part of a sitcom "more like The Simpsons". In a press release, Warner Bros. stated that the new series was "a fresh approach to popular favorites as Pinky & The Brain move from ACME Labs to America's suburbs when they are adopted by the extremely excitable Elmyra." The idea was reportedly met with resistance from the producers of the series.

The apparent dissatisfaction with Warner Bros.' decision to change Pinky and the Brain showed up in episodes. The last script that producer Peter Hastings wrote before leaving Warner Bros. for Disney Television Animation was the episode "You'll Never Eat Food Pellets in This Town Again!", in which the demise of Pinky and the Brain is caused by network decisions to change the show.

The theme song for Pinky, Elmyra & the Brain included the lyric: "So Pinky and the Brain share a new domain. It's what the network wants, why bother to complain?" The lyric is accompanied by a shot in which Pinky and the Brain get kicked out of the Warner Bros. office. In addition, a spoken line by the Brain towards the end of the theme song states: "I deeply resent this."

Nominations and awards 
Pinky, Elmyra & the Brain won an Annie Award in 1999, for "Outstanding Individual Achievement for Voice Acting in an Animated Television Production." Both Rob Paulsen for his voicing of Pinky and Cree Summer for her voicing of Elmyra were nominated in the category, with Paulsen winning the award.  That same year Pinky, Elmyra & the Brain was nominated for another Annie Award, "Outstanding Individual Achievement for Directing in an Animated Television Production," as well as winning a Daytime Emmy Award in 2000, for "Outstanding Children's Animated Program."

Voices 
 Rob Paulsen as Pinky
 Cree Summer as Elmyra Duff
 Maurice LaMarche as the Brain

Additional voices 
 Ed Begley, Jr. - Lloyd Oldtire
 Jeff Bennett - Baloney the Dinosaur, Jimmy, Wally Faust, Roberto, Baloney
 Julie Bernstein - Janson Singer, Singer
 Steve Bernstein - Chorus Member, Singer
 Julianne Beuscher - Clarence
 Charlotte Caffey - Way Cool #1
 Jack Carter - Ziff Twyman
 Nancy Cartwright - Rudy Mookich
 Larry Cedar - Salesman
 Jim Cummings - Manager
 Tim Curry - Monkman
 Blake Ewing - Janson Singer
 Lisa Jenio - Way Cool #2
 Bob Joyce - Chorus Member, Singer
 T'Keyah Crystal Keymah - Nurse Gland
 Tress MacNeille - Marie Maria, Jackie, Gloria Allgreen, French Woman
 Jason Marsden - Taylor Tyler Hoovie
 Andrea Martin - Ms. Entebbe
 Gail Matthius - American Tourist
 Michael McKean - Grocer
 Pat Musick - Old Woman, Weasel
 Bobbi Page - Singer
 David Paymer - Shad Equipo
 Pamela Segall - Andrew Loam
 Yeardley Smith - Gert
 Ben Stein - Johnny Hot
 Ashley Tisdale - Janson Singer
 John Vernon - Principal Cheevers
 Janet Waldo - Old Lady
 Frank Welker - Parrot, Pussy Wussy, Tunk, Penny
 Jane Wiedlin - Vanity White
 Fred Willard - Dr. Glen Tarantella

Media information

Broadcast history 
The series's initial run was from 1998 to 1999 with a total of six episodes. The rest of the episodes were split up into segments as part of The Cat&Birdy Warneroonie PinkyBrainy Big Cartoonie Show along with segments from other Warner Bros. cartoons. The show's inclusion in The Big Cartoonie Show lasted from January to September 1999. In the United Kingdom, the series was fully broadcast on CITV during 2001.

On January 4, 2018, Hulu acquired the streaming rights to Pinky, Elmyra & the Brain along with Pinky and the Brain, Animaniacs, and Tiny Toon Adventures.

Episode lengths 
Many Pinky, Elmyra & the Brain episodes had been split into two parts and aired at different times. The split sections of these episodes were 10 to 11 minutes long, versus the standard 22 minutes for most animated cartoon series.

Home video 

Toys 
Carl's Jr. and Hardee's offered a collection of four Pinky, Elmyra and Brain toys with their kids' meals.

Episodes

Pinky, Elmyra & the Brain

The Cat&Birdy Warneroonie PinkyBrainy Big Cartoonie Show 
Less than halfway through the series' run, Pinky, Elmyra and Brain began airing on The Cat&Birdy Warneroonie PinkyBrainy Big Cartoonie Show, in which one episode segment was shown at a time, rather than complete episodes. The exception to this airing change was episode 10, which was shown completely intact on its respective air date.

See also 
 Elmyra Duff
 Pinky and the Brain
 Animaniacs
 Tiny Toon Adventures

Notes

References

External links 

 Profile of Pinky, Elmyra & The Brain - Warner Bros. Animation
 
 

1998 American television series debuts
1999 American television series endings
1990s American animated television series
American children's animated comic science fiction television series
Animaniacs
Tiny Toon Adventures
Kids' WB original shows
The WB original programming
American animated television spin-offs
YTV (Canadian TV channel) original programming
Television series by Warner Bros. Television Studios
Television series by Warner Bros. Animation
Animated television series about children
Animated television series about mice and rats
English-language television shows
Fictional trios
Crossover animated television series
Daytime Emmy Award for Outstanding Animated Program winners
Looney Tunes television series
Television series by Amblin Entertainment
Television series created by Tom Ruegger